Delhi refers to both a former township and unincorporated community located off of the junction of Ontario Highways 59 and 3.  Delhi is known as the "Heart of Tobacco Country." Prior to 1880, this community was known for its lumber industry. One of the Communities in Norfolk County, Ontario, Delhi, had a population of 4,240 at the time of the 2016 Census.

Founded by Frederick Sovereen (spelled Sovereign by a few sources), the settlement was called  Sovereen's Corners or Sovereign's Corners and was located in Middleton Township. Later, the community was renamed Fredericksburg and, in 1856, to its present-day name of Delhi. The name is usually attributed locally to a postmaster honouring the major city of Delhi, India.

History
Frederick Sovereen (or Sovereign) settled here in about 1812. According to some genealogy records, his father, originally from Germany, was called Frederick Zavering, Zafrin, or Safrein. The records suggest that the family initially emigrated to New Jersey but moved to Norfolk County in Upper Canada because of the Revolutionary War in the U.S. Joseph Lawson bought land at about the same time as Frederick Sovereen (or Sovereign) Jr. but did not actually build a home in the area for some time. The village was named Fredericksburg after Sovereign until the post office opened under the name of Delhi. Sovereign was a tavern keeper for more than 30 years. He also manufactured plug tobacco, growing his own leaves, curing them, and pressing them. He donated the land for the Baptist church and served as the deacon for "many, many years". 
 
The population in 1869 was 300, and the village had some manufacturing as well as a lumber mill thanks to the abundant water power. The post office was receiving mail daily. The railway that arrived in the 1870s was a definite benefit to locals who opened businesses such as the Delhi Canning Company, established in 1878; the company shipped canned local produce across Canada.

The village initially had a log schoolhouse, but a new school was built in 1892. 
By around 1900, the village had an opera house, two tanneries, a railroad station, an Orange Hall, and a Mechanics’ Institute as well as a flour mill, the Quance Mills or Sovereen-Quance Mills. At the time, the primary crops in the area were still fruit and vegetables.
 
Delhi Cemetery was first established sometime in the 19th century. While it was originally a cemetery exclusively for residents who were members of the Roman Catholic Church, changes in cemetery policy made it possible to have anyone buried on their property. At least 4,372 individuals or families have been buried there. Fifteen people from the Delhi area who were killed in the First World War are buried in this cemetery. The last names of the graves belong to different ethnic groups ranging from English, French, Canadian, Eastern European, and those of Belgian descent. There are even a few Chinese families buried within the cemetery, and a large number of tombstones are written in languages other than English.

In the 1960s, Delhi had its own police station, complete with its own jail. Until the 1970s, most non-essential services and businesses closed earlier on Wednesday afternoons. Other economic factors, including the abolition of Canada's blue laws in 1985, eventually forced most businesses to operate seven days a week.

In 1974, the Town of Delhi was amalgamated with the Township of Charlotteville and the Township of Windham to form the Township of Delhi as part of the municipal restructuring that created the Regional Municipality of Haldimand-Norfolk. The Township's administrative centre was located in the community of Delhi. In 2001, Haldimand-Norfolk was dissolved into two separate single-tier counties. Delhi became part of the newly formed  Norfolk County.

Delhi experienced a state of economic stagnation with the early-2000s decline in the tobacco industry; this problem has also affected the rest of the Ontario tobacco belt, including the nearby community of Tillsonburg. People who live in the Delhi area say that farming in the area started becoming highly unprofitable.

While Quance Dam received all-time high water levels during the unusually warm winter of 2009, recent droughts and the erosion of the older portion of the dam are putting the future of this local public works facility into jeopardy. Partly inactive since the 1930s, it was sold to the Quance family in 1987. The newest part of Quance Dam was completed in 1995 once plans to convert it into a hydroelectric plant fell through. More than 1000 fish pass through Quance Dam on an annual basis; a great decrease since 1959 when more than 4000 fish would pass through. The reason for the collapse in fish population was sedimentation, the introduction of stocked fish, and human development.

Old Delhi train station

The St. Thomas and Eastern Railway started operations in the area on November 9, 1998. It is a shortline railroad that serves places like St. Thomas and Tillsonburg that lack the feasibility for service by a Class I rail carriers like Canadian National or Canadian Pacific. The primary customer for the St. Thomas and Eastern Railway in Delhi is Growmark, Inc. (formerly the Norfolk Co-Op).

A railway station for passengers was located on the corner of William and Main streets prior to the 1970s. While the railways were originally thought to be the way to ship cargo in and out of Delhi, the faster and cheaper truck convoys eventually won the day, bringing an increase in traffic volumes and smog into the community. Major products like ethanol, rye, agricultural chemicals, and fertilizer products are sent back and forth between Delhi and St. Thomas.

Geography
There are hills on several of the town roads, particularly on Old Mill Road, William Street, Western Avenue, and Talbot Road. Most of Delhi is situated on flat land. Modes of transportation that are possible in Delhi include cycling, running, walking, and hiking. The streets that are in older neighborhoods tend not to have sidewalks, making urban trail walking a perilous adventure. Shops in addition to a war memorial and the park at Quance Dam are considered to within a reasonable walking distance from the houses and apartments. The overall difficulty of walking through Delhi is considered to be easy.

A bus service makes scheduled trips to the major communities of Simcoe, Delhi, Port Dover, Port Rowan, and Waterford. Service is from Monday to Friday, with no services on Saturdays, Sundays, on major statutory holidays, or after 6:00 P.M.

The major highway route connecting this community to Port Talbot was constructed primarily on an old Aboriginal trail. Delhi remained isolated from the rest of Southwestern Ontario until 1816, when Colonel Thomas Talbot directed the surveyor to build the Talbot Trail on higher elevation land to avoid swampy marshland. This decision led to the irregular and winding route to Aylmer that Ontario Highway 3 is today. Most of Delhi was basically a dense forest until the first generation European settlers came in to build farms and mills during the 1820s. Swamps can be seen within the lower elevation portions of the region, while Big Otter Creek is located in close proximity to the downtown core.

North Creek joins Big Creek at Delhi, eventually draining into Lake Erie at Port Rowan.  The Lehman Reservoir is on North Creek in Delhi and is used for water supply and recreation.

Climate
Delhi has a humid continental climate (Köppen Dfb). Though winters are cold,  mild stretches of weather can bring temperatures above  in January. Temperatures above  occur 10 days per year. Delhi averages 2021 hours of bright sunshine per year or 43% of daylight hours, ranging from a low of 21.2% in December to 62.2% in July.

Demographics
Until 2001, Delhi was located within the Township of Delhi, a municipal government within the Regional Municipality of Haldimand-Norfolk. Delhi continues to have several subdivisions located nearby, including Pinegrove, Gilbertville, and Atherton. Prior to the amalgamation of Norfolk County, the population of the former Township of Delhi was 16,365 in the Canada 2001 Census. The majority of the residents at that time were married Anglophones who were born in Canada.

Even though Delhi is home to a number of Roman Catholic churches, the majority of residents in Delhi during the early 2000s were Protestant. The population includes a sizable number of residents with Dutch, Portuguese, Caribbean, Ukrainian, French, British, and First Nation ancestry.

As of 2016, the majority of Delhi's residents speak English as a first language and were born in Canada. Females outnumber males, and working-age people outnumber children and elderly people. Delhi will experience a surge in old-age pensioners by the year 2026. Seventy people were born in the United States of America, while 250 were born in Europe. Ten residents were born in Africa, while 20 residents were born in Asia. Delhi's population is expected to grow to approximately 5,215 residents by 2056, although future wars and pandemics may affect this population growth. People are less likely to have children or emigrate to Canada if there are any major political/medical events happening in the world.

Economy
Farming remains the predominant local industry, with tobacco and ginseng as the main cash crops. While Delhi used to be a place where transient adolescent workers could find employment quickly, the local police force started to take a less tolerant stand towards these job seekers in the later years. Local farms rely in part upon the Caribbean and Central American workers, who usually arrive around mid-to-late April and return to their homelands around early-to-mid November. Recent years have seen migrant workers complaining of unequal treatment and economic hardships in the hands of local farmers. Proper Spanish-language services for these offshore workers are only available in Simcoe, where these businesses tend to prosper during the farming months and be vacant buildings during the winter.

Three manufacturing plants once were located here; Delhi Industries, Delhi Foundry, and Delhi Metal Products. They both closed due to the changing Canadian economy that emphasized more on service jobs than jobs in traditional manufacturing fields. Delhi Industries lasted until the midst of the Canadian economic recession when it closed down in March 2010, terminating 61 jobs on a permanent basis. They once made fans and blowers for industrial operations in the region. KAIN Logistics, formerly Lake Erie Warehousing, is currently located in the former Delhi Industries building; it provides industrial customers in Southern Ontario with logistics, trucking, and warehousing and storage services. 2600 people in Norfolk County have officially joined the workforce between June 2012 and June 2013. Local businesses have been slowly expanding again. Innovative ways to operate business ventures have indirectly improved the lives of workers who live in Delhi. The economy of the Greater Toronto Area, along with the rest of the world, may become further interconnected with the economy of Delhi.

Delhi has the only Your Independent Grocer franchise in Norfolk County. It is owned by Mr. and Mrs. Matt Wilkinson and is located on the Main Street of Delhi leading into the downtown core. The store itself is a basic one-storey building with three rows of parking and eight aisles for shopping. A drug store is located nearby.

As of 2017, there were eight medical doctors who practice conventional medicine within the town of Delhi. The local health clinic was built in the mid-2000s and continues to expand in order to attract more medical personnel.

Sports

Delhi is home to the Delhi Travellers, a junior hockey team that plays in the Southern Ontario Junior Hockey League. They are also the home of various minor soccer, minor baseball, minor soccer, and minor hockey teams. Minor sports are played by young people between the ages of three (for the Initiation age group) and 20 (for the Juvenile age group) in this region. These events are played out either at or near the vicinity of the Delhi Community Arena.

The local high school plays against other high schools in the region in sports like football, basketball, volleyball, soccer (association football), tennis, badminton, cross country, track and field, scholastic wrestling, and swimming. Close rivalries have developed over the years, particularly with Simcoe Composite School, Valley Heights Secondary School, and Holy Trinity Catholic High School.

North Creek was once the most important spawning point for the local fish species until it was dammed in 1965. Prior to the 1960s, local residents and avid fishermen alike would often stake out ideal fishing spots near the once-fertile tributaries. North Creek is used today as a means to provide a supplemental water supply to the municipally-owned aquifers. The fishing scene within the actual town limits of Delhi has floundered since 1966, forcing today's fishermen to drive to the hinterlands in order to guarantee a catch. Some fishermen have been known to drive to Port Ryerse and Long Point in the search for their next meal or pleasure fishing expeditions.

Education

The local high school, Delhi District Secondary School, has faced the threat of closure in the past, but the local school board has committed to keeping the school open for the indefinite future. Delhi's high school offers courses in science, physical education, math, French, family studies, English, and co-operative education (for the transition from academic life to employment). The local secular elementary school is Delhi Public School. Saint Frances Cabrini Catholic School is also located in Delhi and is part of the Brant Haldimand Norfolk Catholic District School Board's elementary division.

Notable people
 Barry Boughner (1948- ), retired NHL player
 Earl Frederick Crabb (1899–1986), World War I flying ace
 John Leslie Hotson (1897–1992), scholar of Elizabethan literary puzzles
 John A. Schweitzer (1952-), artist, art critic, and philanthropist
 Ryan VandenBussche (1973-), retired NHL player raised in Delhi

See also

 List of unincorporated communities in Ontario

References

External links
 Norfolk County 

Communities in Norfolk County, Ontario
Former township municipalities in Ontario
Populated places established in 1826
1826 establishments in Canada
Populated places disestablished in 1974